Ilocos Norte's 1st congressional district is one of the two congressional districts of the Philippines in the province of Ilocos Norte. It has been represented in the House of Representatives of the Philippines since 1916 and earlier in the Philippine Assembly from 1907 to 1916. The district consists of the provincial capital city of Laoag and adjacent municipalities of Adams, Bacarra, Bangui, Burgos, Carasi, Dumalneg, Pagudpud, Pasuquin, Piddig, Sarrat and Vintar. It is currently represented in the 19th Congress by Sandro Marcos of the Nacionalista Party (NP).

Representation history

Election results

2022

2019

2016

2013

2010

See also
Legislative districts of Ilocos Norte

References

Congressional districts of the Philippines
Politics of Ilocos Norte
1907 establishments in the Philippines
Congressional districts of the Ilocos Region
Constituencies established in 1907